Ağkənd (Azerbaijani for "white village") may refer to:
Ağkənd, Khojavend, Azerbaijan
Ağkənd, Tartar, Azerbaijan
Ağkənd, Zangilan, Azerbaijan